Lu Pinpin (born 23 October 1996) is a Chinese military officer and pentathlete who serves as a corporal in the People's Liberation Army. She took part in the military pentathlon event at the 2019 Military World Games and she shattered the world record in the women's 500m obstacle course on 20 October 2019 with a record timing of 2 minutes and 10.9 seconds.

References 

1996 births
Living people
Chinese pentathletes
People's Liberation Army personnel
21st-century Chinese military personnel